The Armenian birch mouse (Sicista armenica) is a species of rodent in the family Sminthidae.

Description

It is a small rodent, like the mouse, the average weight of 10 g and up to 9 cm long, excluding the semi-prehensile tail, which slightly exceeds the length of the body. The body is brown, darker in the upper region.

Biology
 
The species shows nocturnal and feeds on seeds, berries and insects. Shifts in the ground with small jumps and can easily climb on the bushes and trees due to its semi-prehensile tail. The nest, oval shaped, is made of plant remains in a shallow hole dug by the animal itself.

Distribution and habitat 
 
The species is endemic to Armenia, found in mixed forests of coniferous and broadleaf trees in the area upstream of the river Marmarik.

Status and conservation

The Zoological Society of London, on the basis of evolutionary uniqueness and smallness of the population, considers Armenian birch mouse one of the 100 species of mammals at greatest risk of extinction.

References 

Sicista
Rodents of Europe
EDGE species
Endemic fauna of Armenia
Mammals described in 1988
Taxonomy articles created by Polbot